is a railway station located in the city of Ichinoseki, Iwate Prefecture, Japan, operated by the East Japan Railway Company (JR East).

Lines
Rikuchū-Matsukawa Station is served by the Ōfunato Line, and is located 21.3 rail kilometers from the terminus of the line at Ichinoseki Station.

Station layout
The station has two opposed side platforms connected to the station building by a level crossing. The station is unattended.

Platforms

History
Rikuchū-Matsukawa Station opened on July 26, 1925. The station was absorbed into the JR East network upon the privatization of the Japanese National Railways (JNR) on April 1, 1987. A new station building was completed in March 2010.

Surrounding area
 Tohoku Stone Mine
 The House of Sun and Wind (Museum of stone and Kenji Miyazawa)
 Sunatetsu River

See also
 List of railway stations in Japan

External links

  

Railway stations in Iwate Prefecture
Ōfunato Line
Railway stations in Japan opened in 1925
Ichinoseki, Iwate
Stations of East Japan Railway Company